The 1921 South Africa rugby union tour of Australia and New Zealand was the third tour made by the Springboks rugby team, and their first tour to Australia and New Zealand. South Africa played three Test matches against the All Blacks. The series was drawn 1–all, and the long-running controversy between the countries over the All Blacks' inclusion of Maori players began.

The Springboks played five matches in Australia, winning them all. The three most important matches against New South Wales, were retroactively accorded Test status by the Australian Rugby Union in 1986, but remain as tour matches only for the South African Rugby Board.

South Africa then played nineteen matches in New Zealand, winning fifteen, losing two and drawing two.

Match summary
Complete list of matches played by the Springboks in Australia and New Zealand

 Test matches

Notes

Match details

First Test

Second Test

Third Test

See also
 History of rugby union matches between New Zealand and South Africa

References

South Africa
South Africa
South Africa national rugby team tours of New Zealand
South Africa national rugby team tours of Australia
1921 in Australian rugby union
tour